Giwi Margwelaschwili ( Givi Margvelashvili; 14 December 1927 – 13 March 2020) was a German-Georgian writer and philosopher. Born in Berlin to Georgian parents, he was raised as a German. After World War II, his father and he were abducted by the Soviet secret police. His father, Tite Margwelaschwili was executed and he was interned in the former Sachsenhausen concentration camp for 18 months and then, speaking neither Russian nor Georgian, he was released to Tbilisi, Georgia, where he had relatives. He learned both languages and studied English, working as a language teacher. He wrote novels and philosophy books in German. He returned to Germany and became a German citizen in 1994. In 2011, he moved back to Tbilisi again.

Biography

He was born in Berlin, the son and second child  of the notable Georgian intellectual Tite Margwelaschwili, who had moved to Germany after the Red Army invasion of Georgia in 1921 and was chairman of the Georgian political emigre organization in Berlin from 1941. His mother, Mariam, committed suicide when he was five years old. Due to Allied bombing, he attended several different gymnasium schools in Berlin during 1934 to 1946, and participated in the anti-Fascist youth movement Swing Kids. He went to jazz clubs and loved swing.

Shortly before the end of World War II, he and his father escaped from Germany to Italy where his sister, Elisabeth, lived. While she remained there, the father and son returned to Berlin. In December 1945, Giwi and his father were abducted by the Soviet secret police NKVD. After eight months of interrogations, his father was shot as a traitor. Giwi was interned in Hohenschönhausen, then in the former Sachsenhausen. The location appears in his works only in the diminutive, "Sachsenhäuschen". He explains the absence of references to it in his writings as, because he left the terrible things he experienced there behind.  After 18 months in the camp, he was released, not to Berlin, but to his relatives in Tbilisi.

Margwelaschwili then had to learn Georgian and Russian. He also studied English at the Tbilisi State University, teaching English and German at the Tbilisi Institute of Foreign Languages from 1954 to 1970. During the 1950s, he wrote his first novels and philosophic writings on phenomenology.

For the first time since 1946, in 1969, he was allowed to travel to West Germany as a translator for the Rustaveli Theatre. In 1970, his first scientific work about "The role of the language in Heidegger's philosophy" was published. In 1971, he was appointed to the Institute of Philosophy at the Georgian Academy of Sciences and began philosophical publications. He visited dissident and songwriter Wolf Biermann in Berlin. Due to that contact he was prohibited from leaving the Soviet Union until 1987. In 1972, he met Heinrich Böll, a Nobel laureate in literature from West Germany, who was impressed by his unpublished autobiography, Kapitän Wakusch. Böll tried to help him get a passport, but was not successful.

With the help of civil rights activist Ekkehard Maaß in 1990, he settled in Berlin   and was naturalized as a German citizen in 1994. In 1991, his first autobiographical work, Muzal. Ein georgischer Roman, was published in Germany. Several books followed, including novels, philosophical commentaries on Classical authors, and poems, which quickly won national and international acclaim. Nevertheless, most of his work remained unpublished.

In 1995, he was awarded the Literature Prize of Brandenburg. He became a member of the International PEN and received a scholarship from the president of Germany. The University of Bamberg appointed him professor for poetry. The Academy of Arts, Berlin, decorated him with the Kunstpreis Berlin for his life's work. In 2006, the Goethe Institute awarded him the prestigious Goethe Medal. He held an honorary doctorate from Tbilisi State University. He moved back to Tbilisi in 2011.

In 1970, he married the author and German philologist, Naira Gelashvili. Their daughter, Anna, also is a German philologist. Margwelaschwili died in Tbilisi on 13 March 2020.

Works 

Many of his works were re-issued by the Verbrecher Verlag.

 Margwelaschwili, Giwi: Kapitän Wakusch: autobiographischer Roman. vol. 1 In Deuxiland. Südverlag, Konstanz 1991, 
 Margwelaschwili, Giwi: Kapitän Wakusch: autobiographischer Roman. vol. 2 Sachsenhäuschen. Südverlag, Konstanz 1992, 
 Margwelaschwili, Giwi: Kapitani Vakusi. Kavkasiuri Saxli, T'bilisi N.N., 
 Margwelaschwili, Giwi: Die große Korrektur, vol. 1 Das böse Kapitel: Roman. Rütten & Loening, Berlin 1991, 
 Margwelaschwili, Giwi: Muzal: ein georgischer Roman.  Insel-Verlag, Frankfurt a.M./Leipzig 1991, 
 Magwelaschwili, Giwi: Zuschauerräume: ein historisches Märchen. Autoren-Kollegium, Berlin 1991
 Margwelaschwili, Giwi: Der ungeworfene Handschuh: ontotextologische Versuche zur Abwehr von Schicksalsschlägen in Buch- und Gedichtweltbezirken. Rütten & Loening, Berlin 1992, 
 Margwelaschwili, Giwi: Leben im Ontotext: Poesie – Poetik – Philosophie. Federchen-Verlag, Neubrandenburg N.N. [1993], 
 Margwelaschwili, Giwi: Gedichtwelten – Realwelten. Arbeitsbereich Neuere Deutsche Literaturwissenschaft Otto-Friedrich-Universität Bamberg, Bamberg 1994

References

External links 

 
 
 Andrea Gerk, Ekkehard Maaß: Zum Tod von Giwi Margwelaschwili / "Neben Solschenizyn einer der ganz großen Dissidentenschriftsteller" (interview) Deutschlandfunk 13 March 2020
 Irene Langemann: Zwischen hier und dort: Der Schriftsteller Giwi Margwelaschwili (in German) lichtfilm.de

1927 births
2020 deaths
Philosophers from Georgia (country)
German philosophers
Writers from Georgia (country)
German emigrants to the Soviet Union
Memoirists from Georgia (country)
German people of Georgian descent
Writers from Berlin
Academic staff of the University of Bamberg
Prisoners and detainees from Georgia (country)
Prisoners and detainees of the Soviet Union
Kidnapping victims from Georgia (country)
Tbilisi State University alumni
German male writers
Kidnappings in Germany
Sachsenhausen concentration camp survivors
Soviet writers